Strathcona Park is a residential neighbourhood in the southwest quadrant of Calgary, Alberta. It is bounded by Bow Trail to the north, Sarcee Trail to the east, Strathcona Drive and the community of Christie Park to the south and Strathcona Park Blvd to the west. Strathcona Park lies in the center of the neighbourhood.

The land was annexed to the City of Calgary in 1956 from the Municipal District of Rocky View. Strathcona Park was established as a neighbourhood in 1980. It is represented in the Calgary City Council by the Ward 6 councillor.

Demographics

Residents in this community had a median household income of $105,139 in 2000, and there were 9.8% low income residents living in the neighbourhood. As of 2000, 20.5% of the residents were immigrants. All buildings were single-family detached homes, and 7.9% of the housing was used for renting.

Education
The community is served by Olympic Heights Elementary public school, and by John W. Costello Catholic Elementary Catholic school.

See also
List of neighbourhoods in Calgary

References

External links
Strathcona Park - Christie Park Community Association

Neighbourhoods in Calgary